Ecuador competed at the 2016 Summer Olympics in Rio de Janeiro, Brazil, from 5 to 21 August 2016. It was the nation's fourteenth appearance at the Summer Olympics since its debut in 1924.

The Ecuadorian National Olympic Committee fielded a team of 38 athletes, 23 men and 15 women, to compete in 13 sports at the Games. It was the nation's largest ever delegation, eclipsing the previous record of 36 athletes who took part at the London Games four years earlier. Athletics had the largest roster with a total of 16 athletes; there was only a single competitor each in sprint canoeing, equestrian eventing, rowing, shooting, and triathlon.

The Ecuadorian team featured 20 returning Olympians, with two of them attending their fourth consecutive Games: distance runner Byron Piedra (men's marathon) and weightlifter Alexandra Escobar (women's 58 kg). Race walkers Andrés Chocho and Rolando Saquipay were among the Ecuadorians headed to their third Olympic Games, while sixteen others previously competed in London, including Argentina-born sprint kayaker César de Cesare, triathlete Elizabeth Bravo, professional boxers Julio Castillo, Marlo Delgado, and Carlos Quipo, and freestyle wrestler Lissette Antes. A top eight finalist at the 2015 World Championships, Chocho was originally selected to carry the Ecuadorian flag, but decided to focus on his training for the competition. Instead, judoka Estefania García (women's 63 kg) took Chocho's spot at the last minute to lead the team in the opening ceremony.

Ecuador narrowly missed out on its first Olympic medal since 2008, as Escobar placed fourth in the women's 58 kg, the most successful result of her Olympic career.

Athletics (track and field)
 
Ecuadorian athletes have so far achieved qualifying standards in the following athletics events (up to a maximum of 3 athletes in each event):

Track & road events
Men

Women

Boxing

Ecuador has entered four boxers to compete in each of the following weight classes into the Olympic boxing tournament. Carlos Andres Mina had claimed his Olympic spot with a semifinal victory at the 2016 American Qualification Tournament in Buenos Aires, Argentina. Meanwhile, London 2012 Olympians Carlos Quipo (light flyweight), Marlo Delgado (middleweight), and Julio Castillo (heavyweight) secured additional places on the Ecuadorian roster at the 2016 APB and WSB Olympic Qualifier in Vargas, Venezuela.

Canoeing

Sprint
Ecuadorian canoeists have qualified one boat in each of the following events through the 2015 ICF Canoe Sprint World Championships.

Qualification Legend: FA = Qualify to final (medal); FB = Qualify to final B (non-medal)

Cycling

Road
Ecuador has qualified one rider in the men's Olympic road race by virtue of his top 20 individual ranking in the 2015 UCI America Tour.

BMX
Ecuadorian riders qualified for one men's quota place for BMX at the Olympics, as a result of the nation's top four finish in the UCI BMX Individual Ranking List of 31 May 2016.

Equestrian
 
Ecuador has entered one eventing rider into the Olympic equestrian competition by virtue of a top two finish from a combined group of North, Central, & South America in the individual FEI Olympic rankings.

Eventing

Judo

Ecuador has qualified three judokas for each of the following weight classes at the Games. Lenin Preciado and Freddy Figueroa were ranked among the top 22 eligible judokas for men in the IJF World Ranking List of 30 May 2016, while London 2012 Olympian Estefania García at women's half-middleweight (63 kg) earned a continental quota spot from the Pan American region, as Ecuador's top-ranked judoka outside of direct qualifying position.

Rowing

Ecuador has qualified one boat in the men's single sculls for the Olympics at the 2016 Latin American Continental Qualification Regatta in Valparaiso, Chile, signifying the nation's Olympic sporting debut.

Qualification Legend: FA=Final A (medal); FB=Final B (non-medal); FC=Final C (non-medal); FD=Final D (non-medal); FE=Final E (non-medal); FF=Final F (non-medal); SA/B=Semifinals A/B; SC/D=Semifinals C/D; SE/F=Semifinals E/F; QF=Quarterfinals; R=Repechage

Shooting
 
Ecuador has qualified one shooter in the women's pistol events by virtue of her best finish at the American Continental Championships and other selection competitions, as long as she obtained a minimum qualifying score (MQS) by 31 March 2016.

Qualification Legend: Q = Qualify for the next round; q = Qualify for the bronze medal (shotgun)

Swimming

Ecuadorian swimmers have so far achieved qualifying standards in the following events (up to a maximum of 2 swimmers in each event at the Olympic Qualifying Time (OQT), and potentially 1 at the Olympic Selection Time (OST)):

Triathlon

Ecuador has entered one triathlete to compete at the Games. London 2012 Olympian Elizabeth Bravo was selected as the highest-ranked triathlete from the Americas in the women's event based on the ITU Points List.

Weightlifting

Ecuadorian weightlifters have qualified two women's quota places for the Rio Olympics based on their combined team standing by points at the 2014 and 2015 IWF World Championships. A single men's Olympic spot had been added to the Ecuadorian roster by virtue of a top seven national finish at the 2016 Pan American Championships. The team must allocate these places to individual athletes by 20 June 2016.

Wrestling

Ecuador has qualified two wrestlers for each of the following weight classes into the Olympic competition. One of them finished in the top two final to book an Olympic spot in the men's Greco-Roman 59 kg at the 2016 Pan American Qualification Tournament, while the other had claimed the remaining Olympic slot in the women's freestyle 58 kg to round out the Ecuadorian roster at the initial meet of the World Qualification Tournament in Ulaanbaatar.

Men's Greco-Roman

Women's freestyle

See also
Ecuador at the 2015 Pan American Games

References

External links 

 

Nations at the 2016 Summer Olympics
2016
2016 in Ecuadorian sport